Worms Golf is an action game for Java ME-enabled mobile devices. It was programmed by Rockpool Games and published by THQ in 2004.

Gameplay
Worms Golf is an arcade game based on the sport golf in which the player hits a grenade toward an enemy worm who is tied to a stick.

Sequel
In 2011, Team17 released a sequel, Worms Crazy Golf, for PC, Mac, iOS and PlayStation 3. The sequel was developed in-house, and is based upon the Worms 2: Armageddon/Worms Reloaded iteration of the series.

References

2004 video games
Golf video games
Mobile games
THQ games
Video games developed in the United Kingdom
Golf
Java platform games
J2ME games